Blackville can refer to:
Blackville, New Brunswick, Canada
Blackville Parish, New Brunswick, Canada
Blackville, South Carolina, USA
Upper Blackville, New Brunswick, Canada
Blackville, New South Wales, Australia